Weißblaue Geschichten is a German television series.

See also
List of German television series

External links
 

Television shows set in Bavaria
1983 German television series debuts
1990s German television series
2000s German television series
2010s German television series
German-language television shows
ZDF original programming